Mildenhall is a market town and civil parish in Suffolk, England. The large Royal Air Force station, RAF Mildenhall as well as RAF Lakenheath, are located north of the town. The latter is used by the United States Air Force, as the headquarters of its 100th Air Refueling Wing and 352nd Special Operations Group.

History

Early history 
The area around Mildenhall has been settled by humans since at least the Bronze Age. Following the Roman Empire invasion of Britain, Mildenhall was the site of a Roman settlement, which at some point contained the Mildenhall Treasure.

The name of the town was first recorded in 1050 as Mildenhale, believed to mean a nook of land belonging to a woman called "Milde" or a man called "Milda". In 1086, the Domesday Book recorded that the town was the property of the Abbot of St Edmunds and had a population of some 64 families.

Early Modern history 
With the Dissolution of the Monasteries in 1536, ownership of the town was transferred to Edward North, 1st Baron North, whose son, Roger North, became resident in Mildenhall for a time. Ownership of the Mildenhall estate remained with the North family for many decades. It was Henry North, who upon retirement, built the Manor house at Mildenhall.

Sir Henry North was elected MP for Suffolk in 1673, but he died a bachelor and so ownership of the estate passed to Sir Thomas Hanmer. Hanmer was elected Speaker of the House of Commons in 1714 and spent little time in his estate, he also died without an heir and ownership then passed to Thomas Bunbury, who also became MP for Suffolk.
In 1810 Joseph Smedley was able to hire a building as a temporary theatre for two pounds.

Modern history 
The Bunbury family held the manor of Mildenhall until the estate was broken up in 1933. RAF Mildenhall was officially opened in 1934 and served as a base for RAF Bomber Command during the Second World War. In 1950, the US Air Force took over its operation.

The town
Mildenhall centres on a market place with a 16th-century hexagonal market cross and town pump.  The town's market is held here on every Friday and originated as a weekly chartered market in, it is believed, the 15th century.  In 1934 Mildenhall was the start point of the MacRobertson Air Race to Melbourne, Australia.

Mildenhall has its own radio station, ZACK FM (Forest Heath Public Radio), broadcasting on 105.3 FM; the transmitter is located at the top of St Mary's Church and radiates 100 W. The station format is classic and current hits plus specialist shows, and broadcasts 24 hours a day with a mix of music, news and information.
The town is the subject and namesake of a song by The Shins, as well as being mentioned in passing in the Pink Floyd song "Let There Be More Light" on the 1968 album A Saucerful of Secrets as a speculated location for first contact between humanity and extraterrestrial life:

Then at last, the mighty ship
Descending on a point of flame
Made contact with the human race at Mildenhall

Due to the airfield, Mildenhall currently has the highest concentration of U.S. citizens in the country. As many as 30% of residents were born in the U.S.

Transport 
The town has a bus station, which was completed in 2005. Regular bus services run to the neighbouring towns of Brandon, Bury St. Edmunds, Newmarket and Thetford. National Express operate daily coach services to Norwich, London (Victoria Coach Station), Heathrow, Gatwick and Stansted Airports. Mildenhall railway station was the terminus of the Cambridge to Mildenhall railway until its closure in 1962.

Education
Mildenhall has three schools: two primary schools, St. Mary's and Great Heath 
and one secondary school, Mildenhall College Academy. The secondary school also contains a sixth form.

Sport and leisure
Mildenhall has a non-League football club, Mildenhall Town F.C., who play at Recreation Way.

It also has one of the East of England's leading cricket clubs, Mildenhall Cricket Club, playing at Wamil Way. In 2016 the 1XI won the Two Counties Championship and was promoted to the East Anglian Premier Cricket League. Notable former players include England internationals Tymal Mills and Tom Westley and Essex Women's Lilly Reynolds.

The Mildenhall Cycling Club is located next to the cricket ground, and has famous previous members such as Victoria Pendleton.

There is a leisure centre on Bury Road which is about 5–10 minutes away from the town square.

The River Lark runs through the town, and there is a 19-acre open space adjoining it, called the Jubilee Fields.

Notable people 
Edmund Selous - ornithologist and writer, resident in Mildenhall from 1889 to 1920.
Phil Thornalley - grew up in Worlington.
Elonka Dunin - resident at RAF Mildenhall during her time in the USAF.
Lindsey Graham - U.S. senator, resident at RAF Lakenheath during the 1980s when he served in the USAF as a JAG.
Sir Thomas Hanmer, 4th Baronet - owner of the Mildenhall estate; later MP for Suffolk and Speaker of the House of Commons.
Nicole Malachowski - resident at RAF Lakenheath during her time as a pilot with the 48th Fighter Wing.
James Mercer - musician. Lived in Mildenhall from 1985 to 1990 after his father was based at RAF Mildenhall. He wrote a song about his time in Mildenhall which appears on the 2017 album Heartworms.
Tymal Mills - educated at Mildenhall College Academy and played for Mildenhall Cricket Club.
Sir Henry North - Member of Parliament for Suffolk.
Rick Perry - based at RAF Mildenhall when he was a pilot in the USAF.
Dick Rutan - based at RAF Lakenheath when a pilot in the USAF.
Chesley Sullenberger - based at RAF Lakenheath when he was a pilot in the USAF. 
Heather Wilson - resident at RAF Mildenhall during her time in the USAF.

Archaeology 

Mildenhall is perhaps most famous for the discovery in 1942 of the Mildenhall Treasure. Now at the British Museum, the treasure is a hoard of Roman silver objects buried in the 4th century. In 1946 the discovery was made public and the treasure acquired by the British Museum; Roald Dahl wrote an article about the find which was published firstly in the Saturday Evening Post, and later as "The Mildenhall Treasure" (a short story) in his short story collection The Wonderful Story of Henry Sugar and Six More.  The Mildenhall Museum in the centre of the town contains displays of local history and wildlife, the history of the RAF base, and information on the Mildenhall Treasure. Entrance is free, opening times vary throughout the year.
The region between Devil's Dyke and the line between Littleport and Shippea Hill shows a remarkable amount of archaeological findings of the Stone Age, the Bronze Age and the Iron Age.

References

External links 

 Mildenhall parish council website
 Mildenhall and area community and information website
 Poor parishioners in 16th century Mildenhall

American diaspora in Europe
 
Towns in Suffolk
Market towns in Suffolk
Forest Heath
Civil parishes in Suffolk